D. horridus may refer to:
 Dasydorylas horridus (Becker, 1898), a fly species in the genus Dasydorylas and the family Pipunculidae native to Great Britain
 Deinodon horridus, a nomen dubium, a dubious scientific name of little use

See also
 Horridus (disambiguation)